Siku may refer to:

 Siku (instrument), a kind of pan flute from the Andes
 Siku (Bolivia), a mountain in the Bolivian Andes
 Siku Toys, a German brand of toy vehicles
 Siku (comics), an artist
 Siku (polar bear), a bear cub who became an overnight online sensation
 Siku Quanshu, a compendium of Chinese literature completed in 1782
 Secoo, Chinese online retailer
 Siku Allooloo, indigenous writer
 Siku Ya Bibi (Day of the Lady)
 Siku Njema, a Swahili novel